Tirunellai Narayana Iyer Seshan (15 December 1932 – 10 November 2019) was an Indian civil servant and bureaucrat who served with the Indian Administrative Service. After serving in various positions in Madras and in various ministries of the Central Government, he served as the 18th Cabinet Secretary of India in 1989. He was appointed the 10th Chief Election Commissioner of India (1990–96) and became known for his electoral reforms. He won the Ramon Magsaysay Award for government service in 1996.

Early life and education
Tirunellai Narayana Iyer Seshan was born on 15 December 1932 in Thirunellai Village in Palghat, Kerala. He was youngest of six siblings and his father was a lawyer in a district court. He completed his schooling from Basel Evangelical Mission Higher Secondary School and intermediate from Government Victoria College, Palakkad where he was a contemporary of E. Sreedharan. Though both of them were selected for Engineering in JNTU Kakinada, Andhra Pradesh, T. N. Seshan decided to join Madras Christian College (MCC). He obtained his Bachelor of Science (Honors) degree in physics from the Madras Christian College and later taught there from 1950 to 1952. In 1953, he had left Madras Christian College and cleared the police service examination but did not join. He cleared the UPSC civil services examination in 1954 and joined the IAS as a trainee of 1955 Tamil Nadu cadre.

Career
Seshan was appointed an apprentice administrator, as an assistant collector, for a year at Coimbatore, as a trainee of the Academy of Administration in Delhi. He was first appointed sub-collector in Dindigul. He moved to the Secretariat for Rural Development in Madras (now Chennai) and appointed director of programs and deputy secretary, where he managed a local administration programme for panchayats, from 1958 to 1962.

In 1962, he was appointed as the director of transport of Madras (now Tamil Nadu). In 1964, he was appointed collector of Madurai district. After two and a half years, he went to study at Harvard University on Edward S. Mason Fellowship where he earned a master's degree in public administration in 1968. At Harvard, he developed a connection with Subramanian Swamy who was his associate professor.

After his return in 1969, he was appointed as secretary to the Atomic Energy Commission. From 1972 to 1976, he served as joint secretary at the Department of Space. In 1976, he returned to Tamil Nadu and was appointed the state's secretary of industries and of agriculture for a brief period. After differences with the Chief Minister of Tamil Nadu, he resigned and moved to Delhi where he was appointed as a member of the Oil and Natural Gas Commission and was in charge of personnel. After two years, he served as additional secretary to the Department of Space from 1980 to 1985. Later he became secretary of the Ministry of Environment and Forests from 1985 to 1988. He opposed the Tehri dam and Sardar Sarovar dam on Narmada river during his stint but was overruled. He was later given the additional position of secretary of Internal Security which he served until 1989. In 1988, he served secretary of the Ministry of Defence for ten months. He was appointed 18th Cabinet Secretary, the senior-most position in the Indian civil service hierarchy, in 1989 and later served as a member of Planning Commission.

He was appointed as the 10th Chief Election Commissioner and served from 12 December 1990 to 11 December 1996. According to interview given by him to Business Standard, Law Minister Subramanian Swamy played a vital role in this appointment. He became best known for his electoral reforms. He redefined the status and visibility of the Election Commission of India. He identified more than hundred electoral malpractices and reformed the election process. Some of reforms he implemented include enforcement of election code of conduct, Voter IDs for all eligible voters, limit on election candidates' expenditure, appointing election officials from states other than the one facing polls. He curbed several malpractices like bribing or intimidating voters, distribution of liquor during elections, use of government funds and machinery for campaigning, appealing to voters' caste or communal feelings, use of places of worship for campaigns, use of loudspeakers and high volume music without prior written permission.

During the 1999 Indian general elections, due to his reforms, 1488 candidates were disqualified for three years for failing to submit their expenditure accounts. It was reported that he reviewed more than 40,000 expenditure accounts and disqualified 14,000 candidates for false information. In 1992, the Election Commission canceled elections in Bihar and Punjab due to electoral issues.

Later life 
After retirement as the CEC, he contested the 1997 Indian presidential election and lost to K.R. Narayanan. He taught leadership at the Great Lakes Institute of Management in Chennai and had briefly taught at the LBSNAA, Musoorie. In 2012, the Madras High Court appointed him as an interim administrator to run the Pachaiyappa's Trust in Chennai.

He died at his home in Chennai on 10 November 2019.
He fought on a Congress ticket against BJP'S veteran Lal Krishna Advani in 1999 from Gandhinagar and lost.
He praised the policies of Rajiv Gandhi.

Recognition 
He received the Ramon Magsaysay Award for government service in 1996.

Personal life 
He was married to Jayalakshmi Seshan from 1959 until her death in March 2018. They did not have any children. He knew several languages including Tamil, Malayalam, Sanskrit, English, Hindi, Kannada, Marathi and Gujarati.

Bibliography 

 1995: The Degeneration of India, Viking, 
 1995: A Heart Full of Burden, UBS Publishers,

References

External References 

 1994: Seshan: An intimate story, by K Govindan Kutty, Konark Publishers, 
Complete profile 

Indian Administrative Service officers
Ramon Magsaysay Award winners
Chief Election Commissioners of India
Madras Christian College alumni
2019 deaths
Candidates for President of India
1932 births
Politicians from Palakkad
Cabinet Secretaries of India
Government Victoria College, Palakkad alumni
Harvard Kennedy School alumni
University of Madras alumni
20th-century Indian politicians
Harvard University alumni